"September in the Rain" is a popular song about nostalgia by Harry Warren and Al Dubin, published in 1937. The song was introduced by James Melton in the film Melody for Two. It has become a standard, having been recorded by many artists since.

There were three charted versions in 1937 by Guy Lombardo, James Melton and Rhythm Wreckers (vocal by Pauline Byrns).

Recorded versions
The song became popular again in 1948 and 1949 when versions by Sam Donahue and the George Shearing Quintet briefly reached the charts.
In 1962, the Beatles recorded a rock and roll interpretation during their Decca audition.

Other recordings

Dorothy Ashby - Django/Misty (1984)
Cilla Black
Claude Bolling/Guy Marchand
Teresa Brewer
Dave Brubeck Octet
Chad & Jeremy
June Christy - A Friendly Session, Vol. 3 (2000) with the Johnny Guarnieri Quintet, Cool Christy (2002)
Eddie Condon (1944)
Bing Crosby - Bing Sings Whilst Bregman Swings (1956)
Doris Day - The Complete Standard Transcriptions (1952 recording)
Sam Donahue (1948)
Dorothy Donegan - Donnybrook with Donegan (1959)
The Duprees
Slim Gaillard (1946)
Gossamer (Kwesi Boakye) - The Looney Tunes Show - "Monster Talent"
Earl Grant (1966)
Lionel Hampton
Roy Hargrove - Big Band (2009)
Al Hibbler (1956)
Jools Holland & Paul Weller (2012)
Jack Hylton
Harry James (Instrumental version) 
Jan Johansson
Norah Jones from Marian McPartland's Piano Jazz (2003)
Frankie Laine single release (1946) and for his album Reunion in Rhythm (1959)
Brenda Lee for her album Bye Bye Blues (1966)
Peggy Lee (1945)
Annie Lennox - Nostalgia (2014)
Guy Lombardo (US #1 1937)
Julie London (on her album Calendar Girl, 1956)
Mantovani
Yehudi Menuhin
Willie Nelson - Night and Day (1999)
Red Norvo - Red Norvo with Tal Farlow & Charles Mingus (1997)
Anita O'Day - This Is Hip (2006)
The Platters from the album The Platters (1964)
Sue Raney - Breathless (1997 Compilation)
Nelson Riddle
Marty Robbins - The Essential Marty Robbins 1951-1982: Columbia Country Classics (1996)
Vic Schoen and His Orchestra (vocal: The Notables)
Diane Schuur - Some Other Time (2008)
George Shearing - September in the Rain (2000)
Victor Silvester
Frank Sinatra - Sinatra's Swingin' Session!!! (1961)
Jeri Southern - The Dream's on Jeri (1998)
Muggsy Spanier
Jo Stafford - As You Desire Me (1954) and Love, Mystery and Adventure (2006)
Dakota Staton - Ultimate Dakota Staton (2005)
Rod Stewart  -  Fly Me to the Moon... The Great American Songbook Volume V (2010)
Hank Thompson
Arthur Tracy (1937)
Sarah Vaughan - Sarah Vaughan At Mister Kelly's (1957)
Dinah Washington - September in the Rain (1960)
Joe Williams - Together/Have a Good Time (2006) (with Harry "Sweets" Edison)
Lester Young (1951)

In popular culture
A version by Peggy Lee is heard in the 1988 film ''Gorillas in the Mist.

References

Songs about nostalgia
Songs with music by Harry Warren
Songs with lyrics by Al Dubin
The Beatles songs
1937 songs
1930s jazz standards
Jo Stafford songs
Bing Crosby songs
Frank Sinatra songs
Guy Lombardo songs
Songs written for films
Pop standards
Songs about weather